Psalm 42, Op. 42 (MWV A 15) Wie der Hirsch schreit (As pants the hart) is a cantata by Felix Mendelssohn, setting Psalm 42 in German. It was written and published in 1837 (revised 1838) for soloists, mixed choir and orchestra.

History 
Mendelssohn set the music to Luther's German translation of Psalm 42. At the work's first performance, in Leipzig on 1 January 1838, Mendelssohn conducted the Leipzig Gewandhaus Orchestra, with Clara Novello as soprano. He was the orchestra's musical director from 1835 until his death in 1847.

Schumann opined in 1837 that Mendelssohn's setting of Psalm 42 was the "highest point that he [Mendelssohn] reached as a composer for the church. Indeed the highest point recent church music has reached at all." Mendelssohn himself described it as “my best sacred piece… the best thing I have composed in this manner”, a work “I hold in greater regard than most of my other compositions.”

Structure 
 Chorus: Wie der Hirsch schreit (As the Hart Longs)
 Aria (soprano): Meine Seele dürstet nach Gott (For my soul thirsteth for God)
 Recitative and aria (soprano): Meine Tränen sind meine Speise (My tears have been my meat) – Denn ich wollte gern hingehen (For I had gone forth most gladly)
 Chorus: Was betrübst du dich, meine Seele (Why, my soul, art thou so vexed?)
 Recitative (soprano): Mein Gott, betrübt ist meine Seele (My God, within me is my soul cast down)
 Quintet (soprano with TTBB): Der Herr hat des Tages verheißen (The Lord hath commanded)
 Final chorus: Was betrübst du dich, meine Seele (Why, my soul, art thou so vexed?)

References

External links
 
 Felix Mendelssohn Bartholdy, Psalm 42, Like as the hart longs (MWV A 15, 1837) on the Carus Verlag website.

Compositions by Felix Mendelssohn
Cantatas
Psalm settings
1837 compositions